Twin Peaks: The Final Dossier is an epistolary (dossier-style) novel by Mark Frost, and a sequel to Frost's earlier book, The Secret History of Twin Peaks.

Background
Published after the broadcast of the 2017 series, it takes the form of a Federal Bureau of Investigation report written by Special Agent Tammy Preston for FBI Deputy Director Gordon Cole, on the fates and fortunes of various residents of Twin Peaks, and other individuals encountered during the revival of the show.

Reception
Stuart Kelly of The Scotsman commented "Like the TV version, there is an unsettling balance between gothic horror and slapstick comedy. One very minor character in the original, the vampish Lana – rather winkingly referred to as having “the eternal appeal of the ‘dark feminine’ archetype” – gets a quick cameo on the arm of “a notorious resident of a certain eponymous tower on Fifth Avenue, who was either between wives, stepping out or window shopping”. Yes, that’s where Trump Tower is, and yes, he is wearing the strange jade-green ring which symbolises darkness and corruption. This is a book with a lot of anger about where America is going, set around an idyll that never existed". Glen Weldon of NPR stated "The Final Dossier is all story — in fact, it reads like the "story bible" television showrunners create to build a show's narrative universe, filled with all the good, grounding stuff The Return never bothered with".

Summary
Unlike The_Secret_History_of_Twin_Peaks, which was composed of many documents compiled by Major Garland Briggs, The Final Dossier contains a series of 18 FBI reports written by Agent Preston following the events of the entire series, which expand on the fates of several characters which were not explained in the television series or the previous book, and clarifying some apparent discrepancies between them.
 Leo Johnson autopsy report
 Shelly Johnson
 Donna Hayward
 Ben and Audrey Horne
 Jerry Horne
 The Double R
 Annie Blackburn
 Windom Earle
 Back in Twin Peaks
 Miss Twin Peaks
 Dr. Lawrence Jacoby
 Margaret Coulson
 Sheriff Harry Truman
 Major Briggs
 Phillip Jeffries
 Judy
 Ray Monroe
 Today

The book ends with Preston suspecting the timeline has changed around them, with the residents of Twin Peaks believing Laura Palmer disappeared rather than being found dead, and she hastily leaves the town as her memory and previous knowledge of the Palmer case begins to fade.

References

Books based on Twin Peaks
Epistolary novels
2017 American novels
Novels based on television series
Novels set in Washington (state)
American speculative fiction novels
Novels by Mark Frost
Flatiron Books books